Li Benjian (born March 5, 1986, in Qingdao, Shandong) is a Chinese footballer who currently plays for Chinese club Yuxi Yukun.

Club career 
Li Benjian would start his career playing for the second tier football club Guangdong Mingfeng and would go on to be loaned out to Chinese football club playing in the Singapore's S.League Sinchi FC. On his return from his loan, Li would find out his club were facing financial difficulties and the club moved to Shenzhen in hopes of getting better crowds while the club changed their name to Shenzhen Kejian to represent this. The move turned out to be disappointment on and off the field as the club finished the league tenth as well as becoming bankrupt in the process. Top tier club Tianjin TEDA were, however interested in Li's services and he transferred to them for $300,000 at the start of the 2006 league season. At Tianjin he would make his debut on March 10, 2006, in a 3–2 victory against Shenzhen Kingway. After the game he would immediately become a vital member for the club's midfield until September 10, 2006, when in a league game against Dalian Shide Li's season would end early when he tore his ankle ligaments and had to have surgery.

After he recovered Tianjin had already brought in Jozef Jarabinský as their new coach at the beginning of the 2007 league season and Li was unable to establish himself within the squad. He was loaned out to Jiangsu Sainty at the beginning of the 2008 season where he helped them in their successful bid for promotion to the Chinese Super League. Li Benjian was again loaned out, this time to top tier club Guangzhou Pharmaceutical where he made his competitive debut on the 21st of March 2009 against Henan Construction which Guangzhou lost 2-1. On his return to Tianjin the club had brought in a new manager in Arie Haan who decided that Li should be the club's first choice left winger and Li would repay him by being a vital player in helping the club finish the 2010 league season in second. With the club eligible for the 2011 AFC Champions League Li would play in all seven of the club's games as they were knocked out of within the last sixteen, however the team fared better within the 2011 Chinese FA Cup when they beat Shandong Luneng 2-1 in the final.

On 27 February 2018, Li signed for Chinese Super League club Henan Jianye.

Career statistics 
Statistics accurate as of match played 31 December 2020.

Honours
Jiangsu Sainty
 China League One: 2008

Tianjin TEDA
 Chinese FA Cup: 2011

References

External links 
Player profile at sohu.com
Player profile at 7m.cn
 

1986 births
Living people
Chinese footballers
Footballers from Qingdao
Chinese expatriate footballers
Guangzhou F.C. players
Jiangsu F.C. players
Tianjin Jinmen Tiger F.C. players
Henan Songshan Longmen F.C. players
Chinese Super League players
China League One players
Association football midfielders